Rachel Bromberg is a Canadian activist for community-led response to 911 calls and the co-founder of both Reach Out Response Network and the International Mobile Services Association.

Education 
Bromberg was a fellow at the Yale University Program for Recovery and Community Health and is completing a dual degree in law and social work at the University of Toronto.

Career and advocacy 
Bromberg worked at youth mental health organization Stella's Place, before co-writing an op-ed with colleague Asante Haughton advocating for community-led responses to 911 calls about mental health crisis. She later co-founded Reach Out Response Network with Haughton and has worked with groups in the US who have run community responses.

She also co-founded the International Mobile Services Association where she works on community-led crises response.

She is a member of the Toronto Regional Human Services and Justice Coordinating Committee and a member of the Centre for Addiction and Mental Health's Constituency Council.

Bromberg serves on the board of directors of the Ontario Peer Development Initiative.

References 

Year of birth missing (living people)
Living people
Yale University alumni
Activists from Ontario
Women founders
Canadian founders
Organization founders